The 2022 A-League Men Grand Final was the 17th A-League Men Grand Final, the championship-deciding match of the Australian A-League Men and the culmination of the 2021–22 season. The match was played between season premiers and defending champions Melbourne City and Western United on 28 May 2022 at AAMI Park in Melbourne.

The match was Melbourne City's third consecutive and overall A-League Men Grand Final, while it was Western United's inaugural feature in the Grand Final. Western United won 2–0. This was the first A-League Grand Final to feature two teams of the same city, with both teams representing Melbourne. Western United's win saw the club became just the second expansion side ever to win the A-League Championship, the quickest expansion side to win it, the first team to triumph in their first Grand Final appearance since Brisbane Roar in 2011, and one of just two teams to have won the Championship after finishing outside the top two, with Melbourne Victory first achieving this feat in 2018.

Due to the Australian Professional Leagues announcing on 12 December 2022 that 2023, 2024 and 2025 A-League Men Grand Finals would be hosted in Sydney regardless of which two teams qualified, the 2022 Grand Final will be the last Grand Final to be played outside of Sydney until at least 2026.

Teams
In the following table, finals until 2004 were in the National Soccer League era, since 2006 were in the A-League era.

Route to the final

The 2021–22 season was the league's seventeenth since its inception in 2005, and the 45th season of top-flight association football in Australia. Twelve teams competed in the regular season, with each team playing a total of 26 matches, resulting in an uneven fixture that involved some clubs meeting three times and others meeting only twice. The top six teams qualified for the finals series, which were played in a straight-knockout format, with the top two teams earning an automatic place in the semi-finals and the bottom four teams playing off in elimination finals. One change made was that both semi-finals were now two-legged fixtures with the two winners of the semi-finals on aggregate meeting in the grand final. Melbourne City and Melbourne Victory qualified for the semi-finals by virtue of finishing first and second respectively, whilst Western United (third) met Wellington Phoenix (sixth) in the first elimination final and Adelaide United (fourth) took on Central Coast Mariners (fifth) in the second elimination final.

Melbourne City

Western United

Western United finished the season in 3rd place, where they played 6th placed Wellington Phoenix in the first elimination final, where they won 1–0 at AAMI Park in front of 3,376 fans. Western United then faced Melbourne Victory in the semi-final, who had finished the regular season in second place. After losing the home leg 0–1, Western United then mounted a comeback in the away leg, defeating Melbourne Victory 4–1 in front of 15,349 spectators, with the scoreline being 4–2 on aggregate, to progress to their first ever A-League Men Grand Final.

Pre-match

Venue selection 
The Grand Final was held at AAMI Park in Melbourne, the home ground of Melbourne City. This was the third Grand Final hosted at the venue, after 2015 and the previous edition in 2021.This Grand Final was the last final to be played outside of Sydney until 2026.

Broadcasting 
The Grand Final was broadcast throughout Australia live and free on Network 10 and streamed on Paramount+ and 10Play, the latter being for free.

Officiating 
Chris Beath was selected to officiate the Grand Final on 25 May, which would be his third consecutive A-League Mens Grand Final. Beath was assisted by Anton Shchetinin and Ashley Beecham. The video match officials for the match were led by Kris Griffiths-Jones, who was assisted by Kate Jacewicz and Kearney Robinson. Daniel Elder was the fourth official for the match. Andrej Giev was the fifth official.

Attendance 
The match was the first A-League Men Grand Final since 2019 that did not have the attendance impacted by COVID-19 restrictions. The match attendance of 22,495 was the third lowest Grand Final attendance, and the lowest attendance for a Grand Final that was not impacted by COVID-19 restrictions.

Opening ceremony
Young Franco, Tkay Maidza and Nerve performed before the start of the match and at half-time.

Match

Details

Statistics

Post-match

See also 
 2021–22 A-League Men
 2021–22 Melbourne City FC season
 2021–22 Western United FC season

References 

2021–22 A-League Men season
A-League Men Grand Finals
Soccer in Melbourne
Melbourne City FC matches
Western United FC matches